Archibald Campbell, 5th Earl of Argyll (1532/1537 – 12 September 1573) was a Scottish nobleman, peer, and politician. He was one of the leading figures in the politics of Scotland during the reign of Mary, Queen of Scots, and the early part of that of James VI.

Rise to prominence
Succeeding his father Archibald Campbell, 4th Earl of Argyll (c. 1507–1558) in the earldom in 1558, Argyll's inheritance made him one of the most powerful magnates in the kingdom. A devout Protestant, he along with his brother-in-law, Lord James Stewart, illegitimate son of James V of Scotland, became an adherent of John Knox about 1556. Like his father he was one of the most influential members of the party of religious reform, signing what was probably the first "godly band" in December 1557, and Argyll soon became one of the leaders of the Lords of the Congregation.  Together, Argyll and Stewart negotiated with Sir William Cecil to secure English aid against the regent, Mary of Guise, and were largely responsible for the negotiation of the Treaty of Edinburgh in 1560, which saw the triumph of the Congregation and the withdrawal of French and English troops from Scotland. . It was about this time that Cecil referred to Argyll as "a goodly gentleman universally honoured of all Scotland."

Influences of national events

Decline in influence
With the young queen's return to Scotland in 1561, Argyll and Stewart, now Earl of Moray, retained their leading roles in the kingdom, continuing to pursue an anglophilic policy, and Argyll was separated from the party of Knox.  Their pre-eminence came to an end in 1565, with the queen's marriage to Henry Stuart, Lord Darnley, whose claims to the English throne did not endear him to Elizabeth I of England, leading Argyll and other Protestant leaders to rise in revolt.  When the English failed to help their Scottish allies, Argyll, alone of the rebels, was able to remain in the Kingdom, due to his very strong position in the Highlands.  The failure of the English to come to the aid of his party led to the beginning of Argyll's disillusionment with his previous Anglophilic policy.

Collaboration with Earl Moray
Over the next two years, however, the shifts in Argyll's policies remained subtle, and he remained close to his old friend Moray.  Argyll was tied to the assassinations of both David Rizzio in 1566 and of Henry Stuart, Lord Darnley in 1567, and was horrified by the Queen's marriage to James Hepburn, 4th Earl of Bothwell.  He joined with Moray and other Protestant leaders in fighting Mary and Bothwell in that year, leading to the capture of the queen at Carberry Hill, but broke with his former allies over the question of deposing the queen.

Offices held and military involvement
With Mary's escape from prison in 1568, Argyll became the leader of the Queen's Party, and led Mary's army in the defeat at Langside in which he showed little military skill.  He continued to champion the queen's cause following her flight to England, but eventually reconciled with the regent Lennox in 1571, and lent his support to the King's party, as a means of restoring peace and lessening English meddling in Scottish affairs. He was appointed to the Privy Council that year, and became Lord Chancellor of Scotland in 1572.

Role in Ulster politics
Argyll, in his role as Campbell clan chief, was also heavily involved in the politics of Ulster during the 1560s.  Although he initially hoped for an alliance with the English to secure his claims on land possessed by the O'Donnell and Sorley Boy MacDonnell families against the encroachment of the O'Neill, English unwillingness to work with him led him to orchestrate a marriage alliance among the three feuding clans of Ulster, which would ultimately have major effects on Irish history with the eruption of the Hugh O'Neill rebellion in the 1590s.

Marriages and death
He first married Lady Jean Stewart (died 1588), daughter of James V of Scotland and Elizabeth Bethune; he was thus half-brother-in-law to Mary and to Moray. After divorcing Jean Stewart, Argyll married Jean Cunningham, daughter of the Earl of Glencairn in August 1573. Janet Cunningham gave birth to the Earl's stillborn posthumous son in June 1574. She subsequently married Humphrey Colquhoun of Luss and died in 1585.

Argyll died in September 1573, without male issue, and was buried at Kilmun Parish Church. He was succeeded by his half-brother Colin.

Further reading
Jane Dawson.  The Politics of Religion in the Age of Mary, Queen of Scots: The Earl of Argyll and the Struggle for Britain and Ireland.  Cambridge, 2002.

References

Argyll, Archibald Campbell, 5th Earl of
Argyll, Archibald Campbell, 5th Earl of
5
Lords of the Congregation
Lords Justice-General
Privy Council of Mary, Queen of Scots
16th-century Scottish landowners
Burials at the Argyll Mausoleum
16th-century Scottish peers